The State Bank Building, Decatur Branch, commonly known as the Old State Bank, is a historic Jeffersonian-style bank building in Decatur, Alabama, United States. It was recorded by the Historic American Buildings Survey in 1934 and 1935.  It was added to the National Register of Historic Places on March 24, 1972, due to its architectural significance.

History
The Decatur branch of the Alabama State Bank opened its doors on July 29, 1833. It was authorized by the Alabama General Assembly in 1830 to be one of three branches of the Alabama State Bank. After outstanding debts of over $1 million were unable to be reformed the Decatur branch franchise was revoked. The building remained vacant until the 1860s when it was one of four buildings that survived the Civil War in Decatur, Alabama.  During the Battle of Decatur, the bank was used as headquarters for the Union forces in the area and was also used as a hospital while battles raged outside.  Such evidence of the battle remains: bloodstains are visible in one of the three vaults and slugs from musket fire and Minié balls are still clearly seen in the walls of the building.

In 1881, the First National Bank opened its doors in the Old State Bank building.  But, when First National Bank completed its new office in 1902, the bank building was used as a residence and office by J. Y. Cantwell.  After signs of deterioration began to show themselves, Cantwell's grand niece, W. B. Edmundson, deeded the building over to the City of Decatur in 1933.  Management of the structure was vested in an eight-member Board of Governors.  The petition for restoration was presented to the Civil Works Administration and restoration commenced.  Being one of only a handful of local buildings to survive the destruction of the American Civil War, and after going through the many changes over the years, the Old State Bank has become a symbol of historical significance.

By the year 1946, the building was deeded by its owner to the Morgan County American Legion, Post No. 15.  At some point, the original bank building was completely obscured by a brick facade which also enclosed the front portico and columns.  The appearance was simply a huge, ugly, brick warehouse and, by the early 1970s, the original history was long forgotten.  As part of a plan to remove aging, blighted buildings, a demolition crew was contracted to tear down the old building with a wrecking ball.  It was soon obvious that something unusual was present when the wrecking ball could tear right through the front wall at some places, but the heavy ball bounced off other spots.  The invincible spots were found to be the five limestone columns hidden behind bricks for generations.  (A few of the columns still carry wrecking ball scars.)  The project to demolish the old, blighted warehouse quickly transformed into restoring this centerpiece of a newly formed historical district.

In 1972, the Old State Bank was named to the National Register of Historical Places at the age of 139 years.  Three years later, in 1975, the American Legion, Post No. 15, donated the Old State Bank building to the City of Decatur.  Plans for restoration were put together in the year 1976, as the bank turned 143 years old, and was put under the control of the Old Bank Board members.  Restoration of the bank was finished in the year 1983, at the age of 150. In 1984, a curator was appointed, and daily tours were implemented.  The second wave of detailed restoration was undertaken in the years of 1995-1996 and was led by noted preservation architect, Harvie Jones.  Funding was provided by the Alabama Historical Commission, the City of Decatur, and the Old Bank Board of Directors.  The City of Decatur commemorated the bank's 175th anniversary in 2008.

Architecture 
The architecture of the bank shows the influence of Thomas Jefferson's fusion of Palladianism with Roman temple forms. The five limestone columns across the front weigh 100-150 tons each and were mined in nearby Trinity. The pentastyle portico is highly unusual.

See also

National Register of Historic Places listings in Morgan County, Alabama

References

External links
Old State Bank - Decatur Parks and Recreation Department

Buildings and structures in Decatur, Alabama
Parks in Decatur, Alabama
National Register of Historic Places in Morgan County, Alabama
Historic American Buildings Survey in Alabama
Palladian Revival architecture in Alabama
Alabama in the American Civil War
Commercial buildings completed in 1833
Bank buildings on the National Register of Historic Places in Alabama